Rilind Nivokazi (born 26 January 2000) is a Kosovan professional footballer who plays as a centre-forward for Swiss club Chiasso.

Club career

Early career and Atalanta
On 23 May 2014, Nivokazi joined with youth team of Italian giants Atalanta. In 2017–18 season, he started playing for Atalanta's under-19 squad.

Loan at Bologna Youth Sector
On 18 January 2019, Nivokazi joined Campionato Primavera 2 club Bologna, on a six-month-long loan. One day later, he made his debut in a 2–3 away win against SPAL after coming on as a substitute at 57th minute in place of Kaloyan Krastev. On 16 February 2019, he scored his first goal for Bologna in his fifth appearance for the club in a 2–2 away draw over Hellas Verona in Campionato Primavera 2.

Loan at Lecco
On 10 July 2019, Nivokazi joined newly-promoted Serie C club Lecco, on a season-long loan. On 25 August 2019, he was named as a Lecco substitute for the first time in a league match against Arezzo. His debut with Lecco came thirteen days later in a league match against Novara after coming on as a substitute at 76th minute in place of Marco Moleri.

Foggia
On 1 February 2021, Nivokazi joined Serie C side Foggia and receiving squad number 30. Twelve days later, he made his debut in a 0–2 home defeat against Catanzaro after coming on as a substitute at 81st minute in place of Ibourahima Baldé.

Chiasso
On 4 August 2021, he signed with Swiss club Chiasso.

International career
From 2016, until 2017, Nivokazi has been part of Italy at youth international level, respectively has been part of the U16, U17 and U18 teams and he with these teams played ten matches and scored two goals. On 15 March 2021, Nivokazi received a call-up from Kosovo U21 for the friendly matches against Qatar U23. Eleven days later, he made his debut with Kosovo U21 in first match against Qatar U23 after being named in the starting line-up.

Personal life
Nivokazi was born in Perugia, Italy to Kosovo Albanian parents from Gjakova.

References

External links

2000 births
Living people
Sportspeople from Perugia
Footballers from Umbria
Association football forwards
Kosovan footballers
Italian footballers
Italy youth international footballers
Italian people of Kosovan descent
Italian people of Albanian descent
Atalanta B.C. players
Calcio Lecco 1912 players
Calcio Foggia 1920 players
FC Chiasso players
Serie C players
Swiss Promotion League players
Kosovan expatriate footballers
Expatriate footballers in Italy
Kosovan expatriate sportspeople in Italy
Expatriate footballers in Switzerland
Kosovan expatriate sportspeople in Switzerland
Kosovo under-21 international footballers